Anymore may refer to:

Songs
"Anymore" (Goldfrapp song), 2017
"Anymore" (Melanie C song), 2016
"Anymore" (Teresa Brewer song), 1960
"Anymore" (Travis Tritt song), 1991
"Anymore", by American hip hop group from Mi Vida Local
"Anymore", by Whitney Houston from I'm Your Baby Tonight

Grammar
Positive anymore

See also
Anymore for Anymore, album by Ronnie Lane
"Not Anymore", song by LeToya Luckett 2009